Bamfield Water Aerodrome  is an airport located adjacent to Bamfield, British Columbia, Canada.

References

Seaplane bases in British Columbia
Barkley Sound region
Registered aerodromes in British Columbia